Christina Beier (born June 9, 1984 in Manila, Philippines) is a Filipino born German former competitive ice dancer. She competed with her brother William Beier. She briefly stopped competing with her brother and competed with partner Tim Giesen for one season. Beier & Beier are four-time (2005–2006, 2008, 2010) German national champions.

Career
The Beiers moved from the Philippines to Germany in 1990. Christina Beier began skating when she was seven. She was a singles skater for two years and then took up ice dancing with her brother William Beier. They were the 2005–2006 and 2008 and 2010 German national champions.

They did not compete in 2006/2007 season because Christina was suffering from a foot injury. In February 2008 they withdrew from the 2008 World Championships because of injury.

In May 2008, the Beiers announced the end of their dance partnership. Christina Beier teamed up with Tim Giesen and began competing with him in the 2008–2009 season. She began competing with her brother again following that season. They trained for two weeks with Albena Denkova and Maxim Staviski but William Beier had a problem with his knees, which had troubled him since 2006. The Beiers ended their competitive career in 2010.

Competitive highlights
GP: Grand Prix; JGP: Junior Grand Prix

With William Beier

With Tim Giesen

References

Patinage magazine No. 124, Nov/Dec 2010

External links

 
 

1984 births
Living people
Filipino people of German descent
German female ice dancers
People from Manila
Figure skaters at the 2010 Winter Olympics
Olympic figure skaters of Germany